James Thumwood (1790 – 27 May 1853) was an English professional cricketer who played first-class cricket from 1816 to 1826.  He was the brother of John Thumwood.

Mainly associated with Hampshire, he made 23 known appearances in first-class matches.  He played for the Players in the Gentlemen v Players series.

References

1790 births
1853 deaths
English cricketers
English cricketers of 1787 to 1825
Players cricketers
Hampshire cricketers
Sussex cricketers
Godalming Cricket Club cricketers
William Ward's XI cricketers
Non-international England cricketers